Kawelo (meaning "the waving of the flag" in Hawaiian) is the name of line and or family of the Kauaian kings:

 Kawelomahamahaia (born c. 1630), chief of Kauai 
 Kawelolauhuki, relative and probably daughter of Kawelomahamahaia, and Queen Consort of Oahu
 Kawelomakualua (born c. 1655), chief of Kauai
 Kaweloaikanaka (born c. 1680), chief of Kauai
 Kaweloamaihunalii (fl. c. 1700), chief of Kauai, and the most regarded warrior king in the legends 
 Kawelookalani (died c. March 1823), half-brother of Kamehameha I